Mukim Berakas 'B' is a mukim in Brunei-Muara District, Brunei. The population was 40,710 in 2016.

Background 
The mukim and Mukim Berakas 'A' were originally one mukim by the name 'Mukim Berakas' before being split into the current divisions in 1996.

Geography 
The mukim is located in the north-east centre of Brunei-Muara District, bordering Mukim Mentiri to the north-east, Mukim Kota Batu to the south-east, Mukim Kianggeh to the south and Mukim Berakas 'A' to the west and north.

Demographics 
As of 2016 census, the population was 40,710 with  males and  females. The mukim had 6,461 households occupying 6,397 dwellings. The entire population lived in urban areas.

Villages 
Mukim Berakas 'B' encompasses the following populated villages:

 Kampong Lambak Kanan
 Kampong Madang
 Kampong Manggis
 Kampong Salambigar
 Kampong Sungai Akar
 Kampong Sungai Hanching
 Kampong Sungai Orok
 Kampong Sungai Tilong

Infrastructures

Public housing 
There is a public housing area within the mukim, namely  ('Lambak Kanan National Housing Scheme') located in Kampong Lambak Kanan.

See also 
 Mukim Berakas 'A'

References 

Berakas 'B'
Brunei-Muara District